The Myra Falls ( or rarer: Mirafälle; always pronounced with a German "i") are located in a ravine in the municipality of Muggendorf in the Austrian federal state of Lower Austria (N.B. not to be confused with the Mira Falls (Mirafall)  farther west in the Ötschergräben). The ravine has been cut by the Myrabach, a small tributary of the Piesting.
The Myra, as the stream is also known, rises at the foot of the Unterberg from the Myralucke, a spring steeped in legend, that is fed by an underground lake. Although the Myra is only a few kilometres long, it used to power a large number of mills and sawmills in the Myra valley.

In 1899 plans were laid for "the exploitation of this waterfall for industrial purposes and thus the destruction of a natural beauty".

In 1912 Lord Oskar of Rosthorn (Oskar Edler von Rosthorn) built a small pumped-storage power station at the Myra Falls, that was in operation until 1974/1975.

The gorge runs from north to south and is protected as a natural monument. The subsoil of the gorge is limestone. The Myrabach falls in several cascades through the gorge. At the upper and lower end the water is impounded into a small pond.

A well-developed and popular hiking trail leads through the gorge. It was built in 1885 by the Pernitz branch of the Austrian Tourist Club (Österreichischer Touristenklub), with 19 bridges and 8 ascents (opened: 9 August 1885) and looked after them since then.

There are two commemorative plaques at the entrance to the Myra Falls. The first recalls the "opening up of the falls and the construction of the ascents by the Pernitz Branch of the Ö. TC". The second panel is dedicated "to the memory of the visit to the Myra Falls on 19 September 1801 by His Majesty the Roman-German Emperor, Francis II, Her Majesty Empress Maria Theresa, and by Their Imperial Highnesses, the Crown Prince Ferdinand Karl Leopold Joseph and Archduchess Maria Ludoica, donated by Aust. Tourist Club and the  "Enzian" Alpine Society on 8 June 1902."

There are restaurants at the top and bottom of the gorge.

The Myra ends shortly after the falls at Pernitz where it joins the Piesting.

Postage stamp 
On 7 December 1977 the Österreichische Post brought out a definitive stamp on this subject in their Austrian landscape series to the value of 20.00 shillings.

References

External links

 Mira (Fall der). — Franz Xavier Joseph Schweickhardt, Darstellung des Erzherzogthums Oesterreich unter der Ens […], Dritter Band, Viertel unter dem Wienerwald, Vienna 1831, p. 268 ff. 
 Photos and site plan

Canyons and gorges of Austria
WMyra Falls

Waterfalls of Austria
Gutenstein Alps
Landforms of Lower Austria
Tourist attractions in Lower Austria